Helena Elver (born 1 March 1998) is a Danish handball player who plays for Odense Håndbold and the Danish national team.

She made her debut on the Danish national team on 27 July 2019.

She also represented Denmark in the 2015 European Women's U-17 Handball Championship in Macedonia, leading to the trophy.

Achievements
Youth World Championship:
Silver Medalist: 2016

Youth European Championship:
Silver Medalist: 2015

Individual awards 
 Most Valuable Player of the EHF European Under-17 Championship: 2015

References

1998 births
Living people
Danish female handball players
Handball players from Copenhagen
21st-century Danish women